Graziella Galvani (27 June 1931 – 25 August 2022) was an Italian stage, television and film actress.

Life and career 
Born in Milan, Galvani formed at the drama school of the Piccolo Teatro in her hometown, and participated in several plays directed by Giorgio Strehler in the early 1950s.  She was mainly active on television, in TV-movies and series. She also appeared in a number of films, mainly cast in supporting roles. 

Galvani was married to and later divorced from actor Giustino Durano.

Selected filmography 
 Kapò (1960)
 Ghosts of Rome (1961)
 Shivers in Summer (1963)
 Pierrot le Fou (1965)
 El Diablo también llora (1965)
 Nick Carter and Red Club (1965)
 Unknown Woman (1969)
 Open Letter to an Evening Daily (1970)
 Fiorina la vacca (1972)
 Seduction (1973)
 Miracles Still Happen (1974)
 La terrazza (1980)
 Tre colonne in cronaca (1990)

References

External links  
 

1931 births
2022 deaths
20th-century Italian actresses
Actresses from Milan
Italian film actresses
Italian stage actresses
Italian television actresses